

N

Notes
  Nicosia International Airport  has been inoperative since 1974 but retains its airport codes.
  NYC collectively refers to John F. Kennedy International Airport , LaGuardia Airport , Newark Liberty International Airport , and Stewart International Airport .

References

  - includes IATA codes
 
 Aviation Safety Network - IATA and ICAO airport codes
 Great Circle Mapper - IATA, ICAO and FAA airport codes

N